Donka Minkova (born 1944) is an American-Bulgarian linguist and Distinguished Research Professor at the University of California, Los Angeles.

Books
The History of Final Vowels in English (1991)
 English Words: History and Structure (with Robert Stockwell) (2001, Second Edition 2009)
 Alliteration and Sound Change in Early English (2003) 
 A Historical Phonology of English (2014).

edited
 Phonological Weakness in English. From Old to Present-Day English (2009) 
 Studies in the History of the English Language: A Millennial Perspective (2002)
 Chaucer and the Challenges of Medievalism (2003)
 Empirical and Analytical Advances in the Study of English Language Change (2009).

References

Phonologists
Living people
Linguists from the United States
1944 births
University of California, Los Angeles faculty
Phoneticians
Linguists from Bulgaria
Sofia University alumni